Sutton House is a historic home located at St. Georges, New Castle County, Delaware.  The original section was built about 1794, with the main section completed about 1815. It is a -story, three bay brick dwelling with a lower rear wing and featuring a gable roof.  The front façade features a semicircular fanlight over the main entrance and there is a two-story porch on the rear wing.

The house was built for Dr. James M. Sutton, whose family continued to live there for generations. It was added to the National Register of Historic Places in 1973.  It is located in the North Saint Georges Historic District.

References

Houses on the National Register of Historic Places in Delaware
Houses completed in 1815
Houses in New Castle County, Delaware
National Register of Historic Places in New Castle County, Delaware
Individually listed contributing properties to historic districts on the National Register in Delaware